SM UB-142 was a German Type UB III submarine or U-boat in the German Imperial Navy during World War I. She was commissioned into the German Imperial Navy on 31 August 1918 as SM UB-142.

She was surrendered to France on 22 November 1918 in accordance with the requirements of the Armistice with Germany and broken up at Landerneau in July 1921.

Construction

She was built by AG Weser of Bremen and following just under a year of construction, launched at Bremen on 23 July 1918. UB-142 carried 10 torpedoes and was armed with a  deck gun. UB-142 had a displacement of  while surfaced and  when submerged. Her engines enabled her to travel at  when surfaced and  when submerged.

References

Notes

Citations

Bibliography 

 

German Type UB III submarines
World War I submarines of Germany
1918 ships
Ships built in Bremen (state)
U-boats commissioned in 1918